is a Japanese handballer for Hokkoku Bank and the Japanese national team.

She represented her country at the 2013 World Women's Handball Championship in Serbia.

References

Japanese female handball players
1989 births
Living people
Expatriate handball players
Japanese expatriate sportspeople in Hungary
Fehérvár KC players
Handball players at the 2020 Summer Olympics